York Mediale was an international media arts festival produced by Mediale. It was founded in 2014 and incorporated as a charity in June 2020. It is linked to the city's position as the only UNESCO City of Media Arts.

History
York Mediale was founded in 2014. It hosted its first festival, of the same name, in 2018.

York Mediale 2018

The first York Mediale festival ran from 27 September 2018–6 October 2018 and featured events and installations at York Art Gallery, Holy Trinity Church, Goodramgate, York Guildhall, and King's Square from artists including Isaac Julien, Phil Coy, and Deep Lab.

York Mediale 2020
The second York Mediale festival started on 21 October 2020 and has varying end-dates for the different parts of its four main installations. It featured: 'Human Nature', a series of three installations by Memo Akten, Kelly Richardson, and Rachel Goodyear held at York Art Gallery (until 21 May 2021); 'Good Neighbours', a digitally enhanced walking documentary in Layerthorpe (until 25 October 2020); 'Absent Sitters', a virtual audio-visual experience by Gazelle Twin (until 25 October); and 'People we Love', an exhibition by Kit Monkman at York Minster (2 November 2020–to
29 November 2020).

References

Festivals in York
2014 establishments in England
Arts festivals in England
Charities based in North Yorkshire